This article is about the particular significance of the year 1843 to Wales and its people.

Incumbents

Lord Lieutenant of Anglesey – Henry Paget, 1st Marquess of Anglesey 
Lord Lieutenant of Brecknockshire – Penry Williams
Lord Lieutenant of Caernarvonshire – Peter Drummond-Burrell, 22nd Baron Willoughby de Eresby 
Lord Lieutenant of Cardiganshire – William Edward Powell
Lord Lieutenant of Carmarthenshire – George Rice, 3rd Baron Dynevor 
Lord Lieutenant of Denbighshire – Robert Myddelton Biddulph   
Lord Lieutenant of Flintshire – Robert Grosvenor, 1st Marquess of Westminster 
Lord Lieutenant of Glamorgan – John Crichton-Stuart, 2nd Marquess of Bute 
Lord Lieutenant of Merionethshire – Edward Lloyd-Mostyn, 2nd Baron Mostyn
Lord Lieutenant of Monmouthshire – Capel Hanbury Leigh
Lord Lieutenant of Montgomeryshire – Edward Herbert, 2nd Earl of Powis
Lord Lieutenant of Pembrokeshire – Sir John Owen, 1st Baronet
Lord Lieutenant of Radnorshire – Bishop of Bangor 

Bishop of Bangor – Christopher Bethell 
Bishop of Llandaff – Edward Copleston 
Bishop of St Asaph – William Carey 
Bishop of St Davids – Connop Thirlwall

Events
15 April – Death of William Howells, the notorious "Laleston poisoning" case. His sister and brother-in-law are later acquitted of his murder.
19 June – An attack on the Carmarthen workhouse is blamed on "Chartists and the rabble of the town". After the disturbances, the Lord Lieutenant of Carmarthenshire, George Rice Trevor, 4th Baron Dynevor, takes on the responsibility for administering order in the county.
22 June – The Times sends a special correspondent to South Wales to cover the Rebecca Riots.
25 August – "The Great Meeting" (Y Cyfarfod Mawr) to seek political solutions to the problems underlying the Rebecca Riots is held on Mynydd Sylen in the Gwendraeth valley.
October – Sir Thomas Frankland Lewis is appointed to chair the commission of enquiry into the Rebecca Riots.
1 November – The foundation stone for the first Beaumaris Pier is laid.
22 December – John Jones (Shoni Sguborfawr), one of the ringleaders of the Rebecca Riots is sentenced to transportation to Australia.
Pontardawe Tinplate Works established.
Llewelyn Lewellin becomes Dean of St David's.

Arts and literature

New books
Daniel Silvan Evans – Blodeu Ieuainc
Morris Williams (Nicander) – Y Flwyddyn Eglwysig

Music
David Hughes (Cristiolus Môn) – Y Perorydd Cysegredig
John Orlando Parry – The Accomplished Young Lady

Births
8 January – John Bryn Roberts, lawyer and politician (died 1931)
12 February – John Graham Chambers, sportsman who codified the Marquess of Queensberry rules (died 1883)
17 April – Richard John Lloyd Price, sportsman and squire of Rhiwlas (died 1923)
12 May – Thomas William Rhys Davids, founder of the Pali Text Society (died 1922)
21 May – John Hugh Jones, Roman Catholic priest, translator, and tutor (died 1910) 
11 June – James Milo Griffith, sculptor (died 1897)
18 July – Sir Morgan Morgan, politician (died 1894) 
4 August – Margaret Townsend Jenkins, social reformer and educator who worked in Chile and Canada (died 1923)
30 August – Cyril Flower, 1st Baron Battersea, MP for Brecon 1880–1885 (died 1907)
12 September – William Morris, Baptist minister (died 1922)
17 September – Hugh Williams, historian (died 1911)
14 November – Jenkin Lloyd Jones, Unitarian minister in the United States (died 1918)
23 November – Daniel Lewis Lloyd, Bishop of Bangor (died 1899)
20 December – Frances Hoggan, first British woman to qualify as a doctor (died 1927)
date unknown – Peter Rees Jones, businessman (died 1905)

Deaths
31 January – William Henry Scourfield, Member of Parliament, 66?
28 March – Robert Richford Roberts, Welsh-descended Methodist leader in the United States, 64
27 March – Henry Nevill, 2nd Earl of Abergavenny, 88
23 April – Sir Robert Vaughan, 2nd Baronet, landowner and politician, 75
19 May – Charles James Apperley ("Nimrod"), sports writer, 64?
18 December – Dic Aberdaron (Richard Robert Jones), polyglot, 62/63
date unknown – Mary Evans (Mrs Fryer Todd), first love of Samuel Taylor Coleridge, 73?

References

Wales